Picaroons Traditional Ales are a production of the Northampton Brewing Company Ltd., which was started in 1995 and is located in Fredericton, New Brunswick, Canada.

The Picaroons brand is sold in numerous taverns and restaurants in New Brunswick. It is also sold in bottles in New Brunswick liquor outlets and in a few other provinces as well.

A 'Picaroon' was a common tool used in the logging industry in New Brunswick.

In 2009, Picaroons became one of the first breweries in Canada to launch its own online social network at PicaroonsPub.com.

In 2010, Picaroons partnered with The Bar Towel, an Ontario craft beer web site, to distribute its beers in Ontario for the first time.

In 2011, Picaroons won brewery of the year at the Canadian Brewing Awards.

In 2016, Picaroons opened their new tap house and brewery at Fredericton's historic roundhouse in Devon.

In 2016, Picaroons opened a second location called The General Store on Saint John's historic Canterbury Street.

Brewing
Several year-round and seasonal ales are produced at the Picaroons brewery.
Brewing is done with malted barley imported from England and Germany, as well as whole hops from England, New Zealand and the North American west coast. The particulars of each batch are logged online for public access. This information includes information such as the ingredients, start date and time, and the specific gravity of the water used in a batch, etc.

Picaroons year-round beers are:
Best Bitter
Irish Red
Simeon Jones River Valley Ale [Amber Ale]
Blonde Ale 
Man's Best Friend [Porter]
Yippee IPA
Feels Good Imperial Pilsner
Timber Hog Stout
506 Golden Ale
506 Pale Ale
506 Dark Wheat Ale
Swallowtail Light
Pivot Imperial IPA

Seasonal and special beer:
Maple Cream Ale (spring)
JED IPA (spring)
Dooryard Summer Ale [Organic] (summer)
Melon Head (summer)
Pride Apricot Ale (summer)
Harvest Ale (fall)
Upstream Ale (introduced for conservation society)
Winter Warmer (winter)
Xmas Tree Pivot Imperial IPA (winter)
Blitzen Coffee Stout (winter)

Awards

Notes

Canadian beer brands
Companies based in Fredericton
Alcohol in New Brunswick
Benefit corporations
1995 establishments in New Brunswick